Gaslight (released in the United States as Angel Street) is a 1940 British psychological thriller film directed by Thorold Dickinson which stars Anton Walbrook and Diana Wynyard, and features Frank Pettingell. The film adheres more closely to the original play upon which it is based – Patrick Hamilton's Gas Light (1938) – than does the  1944 MGM remake. The play had been performed on Broadway as Angel Street, so when the MGM remake was released in the United States, it was given the same title as the American production.

Plot
In Pimlico, London, Alice Barlow (Marie Wright) is murdered by an unknown man, who then ransacks her house, ripping her furniture apart as if desperately searching for something. The house remains empty for many years, until newlyweds Paul and Bella Mallen move in. Bella (Diana Wynyard) soon finds herself misplacing small objects; and, before long, Paul (Anton Walbrook) has her believing she is losing her sanity. B. G. Rough (Frank Pettingell), a former detective involved in the original murder investigation, begins to suspect him of Alice Barlow's murder.

Paul lights the gas lamps to search the closed-off upper floors, which causes the rest of the lamps in the house to dim slightly. When Bella comments on the lights' dimming, he tells her that she is imagining things. Bella is persuaded that she is hearing noises, unaware that Paul enters the upper floors from the house next door. The sinister interpretation of the change in light levels is part of a larger pattern of deception to which Bella is subjected. Rough visits Bella and reveals that Paul is a bigamist; he is the wanted Louis Bauer, who has returned to the house to search for the rubies he was unable to find after the murder of his aunt, Alice Barlow.

Cast

Reception
Rotten Tomatoes tallied a 100% score, based on six professional reviews.

Leonard Maltin gave the film  stars (out of 4): "Electrifying atmosphere, delicious performances, and a succinctly conveyed sense of madness, and evil lurking beneath the surface of the ordinary".

The Time Out critic wrote, "Nothing like as lavish as the later MGM version ... But in its own small-scale way a superior film by far. Lurking menace hangs in the air like a fog, the atmosphere is electric, and Wynyard suffers exquisitely as she struggles to keep dementia at bay."

Encouraged by the success of the play and film, MGM bought the remake rights, but with a clause insisting that all existing prints of Dickinson's version be destroyed, even to the point of trying to destroy the negative, so that it would not compete with their more highly publicised 1944 remake starring Charles Boyer, Ingrid Bergman, and Joseph Cotten. "Fortunately they failed, and now the British film has been restored by the BFI and issued in the UK on Blu-ray in a pristine print." Since 2017 the film has been viewable on the YouTube platform.

Denominalization of the play's title 
Self-help and popular psychology authors sometimes denominalize the film's title (also known as "verbing") and use it as a verb ("gaslighting"). Gaslighting, in this context, refers to manipulating a person or a group of people, in a way similar to the way the protagonist in the play was manipulated.

References

Citations

General and cited references

External links
 
 
 
 
 
 
 
 Gaslight at YouTube (full 1940 movie)

1940 films
1940s British films
1940s English-language films
1940s psychological thriller films
British black-and-white films
British films based on plays
British mystery thriller films
British psychological thriller films
Films directed by Thorold Dickinson
Films scored by Richard Addinsell
Films set in 1880
Films set in London
Films set in the Victorian era